Scopula furfurata is a moth of the family Geometridae. It was described by Warren in 1897. It is found in India (Simla).

References

Moths described in 1897
Moths of Asia
furfurata
Taxa named by William Warren (entomologist)